Skanderbeg Square is a square in Pristina, Kosovo.

Location and history
Following the end of the Kosovo conflict in 1999 and no longer under Serbian rule, Kosovo Albanians in 2001 erected a monument within the centre of Pristina to Skanderbeg, a medieval Albanian who fought against Ottoman forces. Over a journey of four days the statue was brought from Krujë in Albania to the middle of Pristina. The Skanderbeg statue of Pristina shares a similar socialist aesthetic and equestrian posture with minor differences in detail to existing Skanderbeg monuments in Tiranë, Skopje and other places in Europe. Skanderbeg is depicted on a horse with its right leg up in a menacing pose and his sword is outside of its sheath and pointed toward the ground. A war memorial dedicated to the victims of the Kosovo war is present in Skanderbeg square along with a series of photographs depicting the missing from the conflict. Skanderbeg Square is bordered on one side by Rugova Square, a space named after the first Kosovo President Ibrahim Rugova and on the other side by Mother Teresa Boulevard, named after Saint Teresa of Calcutta. Along with Tiranë and Skopje, Pristina is one of three Balkan capitals to install a Skanderbeg statue.

Gallery

See also
 Skanderbeg Square in Tiranë, Albania
 Skanderbeg Square in Skopje, North Macedonia

References

External links
 

Geography of Pristina
Tourist attractions in Pristina
Squares in Kosovo